Neige Dias was the defending champion but lost in the second round to Tine Scheuer-Larsen.

Arantxa Sánchez won in the final 6–2, 5–7, 6–1 against Helen Kelesi.

Seeds
A champion seed is indicated in bold text while text in italics indicates the round in which that seed was eliminated.

  Helen Kelesi (final)
  Arantxa Sánchez (champion)
  Jana Novotná (semifinals)
  Sylvia Hanika (quarterfinals)
  Raffaella Reggi (quarterfinals)
  Judith Wiesner (first round)
  Barbara Paulus (second round)
  Neige Dias (second round)

Draw

External links
 ITF tournament edition details

Singles